Peter Muir Doig (27 October 1911 – 31 October 1996) was a British Labour Party politician.

Doig was educated at Blackness School, Dundee, before taking evening classes.  He later became a sales supervisor. He joined the Labour Party in 1930. During the Second World War he served in the Royal Air Force. He was elected a Dundee town councillor for ten years, serving as honorary town treasurer.

Doig contested Aberdeen South in 1959. He was Member of Parliament for Dundee West from a 1963 by-election to 1979, preceding Ernie Ross. On 22 September 1963, Doig was chosen ahead of five other people to be the Labour Party candidate in the by-election. At the time he was a bakery supervisor and chairman of the Labour group on Dundee Town Council. He was also deputy chairman of the council.

In 1966 Doig was recorded as a member of the Transport and General Workers Union and the Co-operative Society. He was married with two sons.

In the 1970s Doig was one of a small number of Labour MPs who supported the restoration of capital punishment, and was reported to favour a "hard line" approach towards crime. In 1979, when chairing the Scottish Standing Committee of MPs he used his casting vote to support a Conservative proposal to give police in Scotland wider powers to search for offensive weapons.

References

Sources
Times Guide to the House of Commons October 1974

External links 
 

1911 births
1996 deaths
Scottish Labour MPs
Members of the Parliament of the United Kingdom for Scottish constituencies
Scottish Labour councillors
UK MPs 1959–1964
UK MPs 1964–1966
UK MPs 1966–1970
UK MPs 1970–1974
UK MPs 1974
UK MPs 1974–1979
Members of the Parliament of the United Kingdom for Dundee constituencies
Royal Air Force personnel of World War II
Councillors in Dundee